Intermediate mass may refer to:

Astronomy 

 An intermediate-mass black hole, a black hole with a mass between 102 and 105 solar masses
 An intermediate-mass star, a star with a mass between 1.8–2.5 and 5–10 solar masses
 An intermediate-mass X-ray binary, an X-ray binary star in which one of the components is an intermediate-mass star

Medicine 

 The intermediate mass of thalamus, also known as the interthalamic adhesion